Estadio Municipal Reino de León is a football stadium located in León, in the autonomous community of Castile and León, Spain. It is the home stadium of Cultural Leonesa (who currently play in the Segunda División B), with a capacity of 13,346 seats.

History
The stadium was inaugurated with a Segunda División B promotional play-off match between Cultural Leonesa vs Xerez CD, where the home team won 1–0, with Ibán Espadas who scored the first goal in the history of this stadium. It took place on May 20, 2001.

International matches

References

External links

 Official website
 Stadium information
 Estadios de España 

Football venues in Castile and León
Cultural y Deportiva Leonesa
Buildings and structures in León, Spain
Sports venues completed in 2001
Sport in León, Spain